The 1994–1995 season was the 116th season in Bolton Wanderers F.C.'s existence, and their second successive season in the Football League First Division. It covers the period from 1 July 1994 to 30 June 1995.

Results

Football League First Division

Football League First Division play-offs

F.A. Cup

Coca-Cola Cup

Top scorers

References

Bolton Wanderers F.C.
Bolton Wanderers F.C. seasons